A temporal network, also known as a time-varying network, is a network whose links are active only at certain points in time. Each link carries information on when it is active, along with other possible characteristics such as a weight. Time-varying networks are of particular relevance to spreading processes, like the spread of information and disease, since each link is a contact opportunity and the time ordering of contacts is included.

Examples of time-varying networks include communication networks where each link is relatively short or instantaneous, such as phone calls or e-mails. Information spreads over both networks, and some computer viruses spread over the second. Networks of physical proximity, encoding who encounters whom and when, can be represented as time-varying networks. Some diseases, such as airborne pathogens, spread through physical proximity. Real-world data on time resolved physical proximity networks has been used to improve epidemic modeling.
Neural networks and brain networks can be represented as time-varying networks since the activation of neurons are time-correlated.

Time-varying networks are characterized by intermittent activation at the scale of individual links. This is in contrast to various models of network evolution, which may include an overall time dependence at the scale of the network as a whole.

Applicability
Time-varying networks are inherently dynamic, and used for modeling spreading processes on networks. Whether using time-varying networks will be worth the added complexity depends on the relative time scales in question. Time-varying networks are most useful in describing systems where the spreading process on a network and the network itself evolve at similar timescales.

Let the characteristic timescale for the evolution of the network be , and the characteristic timescale for the evolution of the spreading process be . A process on a network will fall into one of three categories:
 Static approximation – where . The network evolves relatively slowly, so the dynamics of the process can be approximated using a static version of the network.
 Time-varying network – where . The network and the process evolve at comparable timescales so the interplay between them becomes important.
 Annealed approximation – where . The network evolves relatively rapidly, so the dynamics of the process can be approximated using a time averaged version of the network.

The flow of data over the internet is an example for the first case, where the network changes very little in the fraction of a second it takes for a network packet to traverse it. The spread of sexually transmitted diseases is an example of the second, where the prevalence of the disease spreads in direct correlation to the rate of evolution of the sexual contact network itself. Behavioral contagion is an example of the third case, where behaviors spread through a population over the combined network of many day-to-day social interactions.

Representations
There are three common representations for time-varying network data.
Alternatively, it can be represented as an edge list  where each edge  is a pair of nodes and has a set of active times .
 Interval graphs – if the duration of interactions are non-negligible,  becomes a set of intervals over which the edge  is active. 
 Snapshots – time-varying networks can also be represented as a series of static networks, one for each time step.

Properties
The measures used to characterize static networks are not immediately transferable to time-varying networks.  See Path, Connectedness, Distance, Centrality. However, these network concepts have been adapted to apply to time-varying networks.

Time respecting paths
Time respecting paths are the sequences of links that can be traversed in a time-varying network under the constraint that the next link to be traversed is activated at some point after the current one. In contrast to paths in static and evolving networks, however, time respecting paths are also non-transitive. Furthermore, time respecting paths are themselves time-varying, and are only valid paths during a specific time interval.

Reachability
While analogous to connectedness in static networks, reachability is a time-varying property best defined for each node in the network. The set of influence of a node  is the set of all nodes that can be reached from  via time respecting paths, note that it is dependent on the start time . The source set of a node  is the set of all nodes that can reach  via time respecting paths within a given time interval.

Connectedness of an entire network is less conclusively defined, although some have been proposed. A component may be defined as strongly connected if there is a directed time respecting path connecting all nodes in the component in both directions. A component may be defined as weakly connected if there is an undirected time respecting path connecting all nodes in the component in both directions. Also, a component may be defined as transitively connected if transitivity holds for the subset of nodes in that component.

Causal fidelity
Causal fidelity quantifies the goodness of the static approximation of a temporal network. Such a static approximation is generated by aggregating the edges of a temporal network over time. The idea of causal fidelity is to compare the number of paths between all node pairs in the temporal network  (that is, all time respecting paths) with the number of paths  between all nodes in the static approximation of the network. The causal fidelity is then defined by 

 . 

Since in  only time respecting paths are considered, and consequently . A high causal fidelity  means that the considered temporal network is well approximated by its static (aggregated) counterpart. If , then most node pairs that are reachable the static representation are not connected by time respecting paths in the temporal network.

Latency
Also called temporal distance, latency is the time-varying equivalent to distance. In a time-varying network any time respecting path has a duration, namely the time it takes to follow that path. The fastest such path between two nodes is the latency, note that it is also dependent on the start time.

Centrality measures

Measuring centrality on time-varying networks involves a straightforward replacement of distance with latency. For discussions of the centrality measures on a static network see Centrality.
 Closeness centrality is large for nodes  that are close to all other nodes (i.e. have small latency  for all )

 

 Betweenness centrality is large for nodes that are often a part of the smallest latency paths between other pairs of nodes.

 

 The time-varying nature of latency, specifically that it will become infinity for all node pairs as the time approaches the end of the network interval used, makes an alternative measure of closeness useful. Efficiency uses instead the reciprocal of the latency, so the efficiency approaches zero instead of diverging. Higher values for efficiency correspond to more central nodes in the network.

Temporal patterns
Time-varying network allow for analysis of explicit time dependent properties of the network. It is possible to extract recurring and persistent patterns of contact from time-varying data in many ways. This is an area of ongoing research.
 Characteristic times of the system can be found by looking for distinct changes in a variable, such as the reachability ratio. For example, if one allows only a finite waiting time at all nodes in calculating latency, one can find interesting patterns in the resulting reachability ratio. For a mobile call network, the reachability ratio has been found to increase dramatically if one allows delays of at least two days, and for the airline network the same effect has been found at around 30 minutes. Moreover, the characteristic time scale of a temporal network is given by the mode of the distribution of shortest path durations. This distribution can be calculated using the reachability between all node pairs in the network.
 Persistent patterns are ones that reoccur frequently in the system.
 Motifs are specific temporal patterns that occur more often the expected in a system. The time-varying network of Facebook wall postings, for example, has higher frequency of chains, stars, and back and forth interactions that could be expected for a randomized network. 
 Egocentric Temporal motifs can be used to exploit temporal ego-networks. Due to their first-order complexity can be counted in large graphs in a reasonable execution time. For example, Longa et al.  show how to use Egocentric Temporal Motifs for measuring distances among face-to-face interaction networks in different social contexts.
Detecting missing links

Dynamics
Time-varying networks allow for the analysis of an entirely new dimension of dynamic processes on networks. In cases where the time scales of evolution of the network and the process are similar, the temporal structure of time-varying networks has a dramatic impact on the spread of the process over the network.

Burstiness
The time between two consecutive events, for an individual node or link, is called the inter-event time. The distribution of inter-event times of a growing number of important, real-world, time-varying networks have been found to be bursty, meaning inter-event times are very heterogeneous – they have a heavy-tailed distribution. This translates to a pattern of activation where activity comes in bursts separated by longer stretches of inactivity.

Burstiness of inter-event times can dramatically slow spreading processes on networks, which has implications for the spread of disease, information, ideas, and computer viruses. However, burstiness can also accelerate spreading processes, and other network properties also have an effect on spreading speed. Real-world time-varying networks may thus promote spreading processes despite having a bursty inter-event time distribution.

Burstiness as an empirical quantity can be calculated for any sequence of inter-event times,  by comparing the sequence to one generated by a Poisson process. The ratio of the standard deviation, to the mean, of a Poisson process is 1. This measure compares  to 1.

Burstiness varies from −1 to 1. B = 1 indicates a maximally bursty sequence, B = 0 indicates a Poisson distribution, and B = −1 indicates a periodic sequence.

See also 
 Complex contagion
 Complex network
 Epidemic model
 Directed percolation
 Dynamic network analysis
 Exponential random graph models
 Link-centric preferential attachment
 Scale-free network
 Percolation theory

References 

Network theory